Felthouse v Bindley [1862] EWHC CP J35, is the leading English contract law case on the rule that one cannot impose an obligation on another to reject one's offer. This is sometimes misleadingly expressed as a rule that "silence cannot amount to acceptance".

Later the case has been rethought, because it appeared that on the facts, acceptance was communicated by conduct (see, Brogden v Metropolitan Railway). Furthermore, in Rust v Abbey Life Assurance Co Ltd the Court of Appeal held that a failure by a proposed insured to reject a proffered insurance policy for seven months justified on its own an inference of acceptance.

Facts
Paul Felthouse was a builder who lived in London. He wanted to buy a horse from his nephew, John Felthouse. After a letter from the nephew concerning a discussion about buying the horse, the uncle replied saying

"If I hear no more about him, I consider the horse mine at £30.15s."

The nephew did not reply. He was busy at auctions on his farm in Tamworth. He told the man running the auctions, William Bindley, not to sell the horse. But by accident, Bindley did. Uncle Felthouse then sued Bindley in the tort of conversion - using someone else's property inconsistently with their rights. But for the Uncle to show the horse was his property, he had to show there was a valid contract. Bindley argued there was not, since the nephew had never communicated his acceptance of the uncle's offer.

Judgment
The court ruled that Felthouse did not have ownership of the horse as there was no acceptance of the contract. Acceptance must be communicated clearly and cannot be imposed due to silence of one of the parties. The uncle had no right to impose a sale through silence whereby the contract would only fail by repudiation. Though the nephew expressed interest in completing the sale there was no communication of that intention until after the horse was sold at auction on 25 February. The nephew's letter of 27 February which was submitted as evidence by Felthouse was judged to be the first instance of communication where the acceptance was communicated to the offeror(Felthouse).And by this time, the horse had already been sold. Accordingly Felthouse had no interest in the property.

Willes J delivered the lead judgment.

The result was affirmed in the Court of Exchequer Chamber, (1863) 7 LT 835.

See also
English contract law
Brogden v Metropolitan Railway Company (1876–77) LR 2 App Cas 666

Notes

References
C Miller, ‘Felthouse v Bindley Revisited’ (1972) 35 Modern Law Review 489 argues that the decision was incorrect because all the evidence showed the nephew was willing, and he had positively conducted himself to that effect. He even argues that against a third party, the fact that the nephew was willing takes away any need for positive conduct.
Fairline Shipping Corp v Adamson [1975] QB 180, 189 cast doubt on the article’s approach.

1862 in case law
English agreement case law
1862 in British law
Court of Common Pleas (England) cases